Armstrong is a small lunar impact crater located in the southern part of the Mare Tranquillitatis. It lies about 50 kilometers to the northeast of the Apollo 11 landing site, Tranquility Base. Named after American astronaut Neil Armstrong, the crater is the easternmost of the row of three craters named in honor of the Apollo 11 crew members. To the north is the Ranger 8 impact site.

This crater was previously identified as Sabine E before being renamed by the IAU. Sabine itself is located due west of Armstrong.

See also
 6469 Armstrong, asteroid
 Aldrin (crater)
 Collins (crater)

References

 
 
 
 
 
 
 
 
 
 
 

Impact craters on the Moon
Apollo 11
Crater